William Atwater may refer to:

 William Atwater (curator) (born 1945), author and former director of the United States Army Ordnance Museum, Aberdeen, Maryland, United States
 William Atwater (bishop) (1440–1521), English churchman and Bishop of Lincoln